Fadli Immammuddin or by full name Muhammad Fadli Immammuddin, (born 25 July 1984) is an Indonesian former motorcycle racer and a current para-cycling athlete.

Early career 
He began racing in 2001 by participating in regional championships in scooter class, riding modified Vespa scooters. Throughout 2000s, he competed in both regional and national championships in Indonesia, varied from 110cc novice underbone to 115cc seeded underbone. He won the 115cc underbone class of Asia Road Racing Championship (ARRC) in 2004. In the same year he won gold medal in motorcycling in the 2004 Pekan Olahraga Nasional (team 4-stroke 110cc) and silver in individual 2-stroke underbone class. In general, he has achieved 6 national titles in various classes (4-stroke 110cc 2004, Indoprix 2007 in both MP1 and MP2 classes, Indonesia Racing Series or IRS 2010-11, and IRS in Supersport 600cc class 2013). He also raced in ARRC Supersport 600 class until 2015 season.

Moto2 World Championship

Fadli took part in the 2013 Malaysian motorcycle Grand Prix. He raced for JiR Moto2 team as a replacement for Mike di Meglio. Unfortunately, he was caught in a crash that took down other riders including Zaqhwan Zaidi, Axel Pons, and Decha Kraisart shortly before the second lap. The Cibinong-born rider was unable to restart the race. Fadli's participation there remains his sole appearance in the Grand Prix racing.

Later career

During the 2015 Indonesian Round of Supersport 600 ARRC at Sentul International Circuit, Fadli was celebrating his Race 2 victory in front of the local crowd when he was hit from the back by a Thai rider, Jakkrit Sawangswat. The crash was inevitable and he was badly injured that later the injury required him to have his left leg amputated. This marks the end of his professional motorcycle racing career.

After the incident, it was reported that Sawangswat lost his motivation to race and gave up racing, possibly being pressured by the guilt over the incident at Sentul. However, Fadli himself traveled to Thailand to personally meet the Thai rider, telling him to forget about the incident and continue racing again. The two riders now have become best friends.

In 2018, Fadli started his career in auto racing by participating in Indonesia Sentul Series of Motorsport (ISSOM) and national level one-make race series.

Paracycling career 
After recovering from his injuries sustained from his career-ending motorcycle crash, Fadli became a para-cycling athlete as he joined Indonesia national para-cycling team in 2017. He made his debut in 2017 Asian Cycling Championships, finishing fourth in time-trial C4 class. He represented Indonesia in 2018 Asian Para Games in several classes of cycling. He won a silver medal in Road Cycling C4 class (which took place at Sentul International Circuit), and a gold in Track Cycling Pursuit C4 class.

Fadli was part of Indonesia national team in 2018 UCI Para-cycling Road World Championship and 2019 UCI Para-cycling Track World Championships. He earned gold in C4 category of para-cycling in 2019 Asian Road Cycling Championships, gold in individual pursuit C4 category of para-cycling in 2019 Asian Track Cycling Championships, and gold at 2019 Asian Track Championship in Jincheon, South Korea.

He participated in 2020 Summer Paralympics, where he finished 17th in Men's time trial C4–5 and 6th in Men's individual pursuit C4.

Awards and nominations

Career statistics

By season

By class

Races by year
(key)

References

External links
 Fadli Immammuddin at MotoGP
 

1984 births
Living people
Indonesian motorcycle racers
Indonesian motorsport people
Indonesian male cyclists
Paralympic cyclists of Indonesia
Cyclists at the 2020 Summer Paralympics
Indonesian Muslims
Sportspeople from West Java
People from Bogor
21st-century Indonesian people